KQXR is a commercial radio station licensed in Payette, Idaho, broadcasting to the Boise, Idaho metro area on 100.3 FM.  The station is owned by Lotus Communications with studios located at 5257 Fairview Avenue #260, Boise, Idaho 83706.

"The X"—as the station is commonly known, plays an active rock radio format and positions themselves as "100.3 The X...Rocks."

The station was a finalist for Radio and Records magazine's 2007 Industry Achievement Award for best Alternative Station for markets 100 and up.  Other finalists include WKZQ-FM, WJSE, WBTZ, KXNA, and WSFM. The station won the "Small Market Radio Station of the Year" at the RadioContraband Rock Radio Convention in 2017.

Journal Communications and the E. W. Scripps Company announced on July 30, 2014 that the two companies would merge to create a new broadcast company under the E. W. Scripps Company name that will own the two companies' broadcast properties, including KQXR. The transaction is slated to be completed in 2015, pending shareholder and regulatory approvals.

In January 2018, Scripps announced that it would sell all of its radio stations. In August 2018, Lotus Communications announced that it would acquire Scripps' Boise & Tucson clusters for $8 million. The sale was completed on December 12.

History

KWBJ (1978-1984) 
The station signed on at 100.1 FM in 1978 with the call letters KWBJ.

Top 40 (1984-1993) 
The station had a rock-leaning top 40 format branded as Power 100 in the Ontario, Oregon area at 98,000 watts, reaching the signal to most of the Treasure Valley including Parma, Caldwell, Nampa, and most parts of Ada County.

Rock (1993-1995) 
In 1993, KQXR moved to the present frequency following a realignment and picked up a hard rock format around the same year branded as Pirate Radio 100.3.

Alternative (1995-2010) 
KQXR flipped to alternative rock and rebranded as 100.3 The X on August 25, 1995. The X started out playing Alternative rock however the music overlapped with J-105 (KJOT). In the 2000s, KJOT dropped active rock for classic rock, paving the way for KQXR to incorporate more hard rock.

Active rock (2010-present) 
The station shifted to a full fledged active rock format in 2010.

References

External links
Official Website

QXR
Active rock radio stations in the United States
Radio stations established in 1978
Lotus Communications stations